The Grand Army of the Republic Hall is an historic Grand Army of the Republic building located at 714 W. State Street in Boise, Idaho.

History 
The hall was built in 1892 by members of the GAR as a memorial to the Union Army veterans of the Civil War. It was the meeting place of Phil Sheridan GAR Post No. 4, which was named for Union General Philip Sheridan. It was one of 32 GAR halls in Idaho.

On January 21, 1974, it was added to the National Register of Historic Places.

The building, which is across the street from the Idaho State Capitol, is now used for University of Idaho administration offices.

See also
 Grand Army of the Republic Hall (disambiguation)
 List of Registered Historic Places in Idaho
 Sons of Union Veterans of the Civil War

References

External links
 Civil War Veterans in Idaho
 GAR Department of Idaho: Post Names and Locations
 National Register of Historic Places

Clubhouses on the National Register of Historic Places in Idaho
Idaho
Buildings and structures in Boise, Idaho
University of Idaho buildings and structures
National Register of Historic Places in Boise, Idaho
1892 establishments in Idaho
Idaho in the American Civil War